Richard George Ebdon (3 May 1913 – 27 April 1987) was an English professional football forward. He was born and died in Ottery St Mary, Devon.

Dick "Digger" Ebdon joined Exeter City from local side Ottery St Mary in December 1935 and went on to score 52 goals in 139 league games for the Grecians in a career interrupted by war. In July 1948 he moved to Torquay United and scored on his debut in a 3–1 win at home to Notts County. However, with competition from Jack Conley and Ron Shaw played only four further games before leaving league football. Digger remained competitive right to the end, winning a game of pool he sat down and died

Ebdon died in April 1987 aged 73.

Notes

References

1913 births
1987 deaths
People from Ottery St Mary
English footballers
Association football inside forwards
Ottery St Mary A.F.C. players
Exeter City F.C. players
Torquay United F.C. players
English Football League players